Women's fencing is the practice of fencing by women. It has been present at the Summer Olympic Games since the 1924 Olympics in Paris. Foil was then the only weapon used and Danish Ellen Osiier became the first female Olympic champion in fencing.

Bibliography

 Alexandre Bergès, L'Escrime et la femme, D. Benoist, Paris, 1896.
Paola Luisa Mangiacapra, Comparative Energy Cost of Fencing for Women, University of Illinois at Urbana–Champaign, 1968.
Zhou Yongchen, "Analysis of the Women's Fencing in Our Country", Journal of Anhui Sports Science, 2000.
Anita Evangelista, Nick Evangelista, The Woman Fencer, Wish Publishing, Terre Haute, 2001 – .
Milly Mogulof, Foiled:Hitler's Jewish Olympian: The Helene Mayer Story, RDR Books, Oakland, 2002 – .
Zhang Ai-min, Zhu Yi-qun, Wu Xia-ping, "Investigation and Analysis on the Statue Quo of Chinese Women Sabre Fencing", Journal of Nanjing Institute of Physical Education, 2004.
Sherraine MacKay, Running With Swords: The Adventures and Misadventures of the Irrepressible Canadian Fencing Champion, Fitzhenry & Whiteside, Markham, 2005 – .
 Valentina Vezzali, A viso scoperto, Sperling & Kupfer, Milan, 2006 – .
Jiang Lan, "Application of Counter Offensive Technology in Modern Women Epee Competition", Journal of Nanjing Institute of Physical Education, 2008.
Dai Qing, Shu Jian-ping, "The Utilization of Counterattack in Female Epee Competition", Journal of Hefei University, 2008.
Raúl Bescós, Marc Esteve, Jordi Porta, Mercè Mateu, Alfredo Irurtia, Martin Voracek, "Prenatal programming of sporting success: Associations of digit ratio (2D:4D), a putative marker for prenatal androgen action, with world rankings in female fencers", Journal of Sports Sciences, 2009.
M. Voracek, B. Reimer, S. G. Dressler, "Digit ratio (2D:4D) predicts sporting success among female fencers independent from physical, experience, and personality factors", Scandinavian Journal of Medicine & Science in Sports, 2010.
Thierry Terret, Cécile Ottogalli-Mazzacavallo, "Women in Weapon Land: The Rise of International Women's Fencing", The International Journal of the History of Sport, 2012.
 Valentina Vezzali, Betta Carbone, Io, Valentina Vezzali, Baldini & Castoldi, Milan, 2012 – .

See also

Women's fencing in Australia

 
Fencing
Fencing